Central Phitsanulok (previously known as CentralPlaza Phitsanulok) is a shopping mall in Mueang District, Phitsanulok, Thailand.

Overview
The shopping mall has a total of 3 floors.

Anchor
 Robinson Department Store
 Tops
 Major Cineplex 5 Cinemas
 Officemate
 Power Buy
 B2S
 Supersports
 Food Park
 Escent Town Phitsanulok

Operation hours
 Mon. - Fri. 11:00 a.m. - 9:00 p.m. 
 Sat. - Sun. and Holiday 10:00 a.m. - 9:00 p.m

See also
 List of shopping malls in Thailand

Notes

References 
 
 

Shopping malls in Thailand
Central Pattana
Shopping malls established in 2011
2011 establishments in Thailand